Santuario del Carbayu is a church in  Asturias, Spain. The present Baroque-style church was built in the 18th century to replace an earlier romanesque temple. It was declared Bien de Interés Cultural (Cultural Interesting Point) in 1992.

According to a legend, the Virgin appeared on an Oak (Carbayu in Asturian language). The figure of the Virgin Mary is situated on the trunk of an Oak in the baroque altarpiece.

References 

Churches in Asturias
18th-century establishments in Spain
Bien de Interés Cultural landmarks in Asturias
Baroque architecture in Asturias
18th-century Roman Catholic church buildings in Spain